Jorge Antonio Kahwagi Macari (born May 28, 1968) is a Mexican businessman, politician, and show business personality.

Early life
Kahwagi is son of Jorge Kahwagi Gastine, the president of CONCANACO 
He graduated from university with a quadruple-major with a major of body building science, and serves as the vice-president for the tabloid newspaper La Crónica de Hoy. He is of Lebanese descent.

Career

Boxing
Kahwagi debuted professionally in the sport on December 10, 2001, knocking out newcomer Perry Williams in the first round, and ended his career in 2015 after establishing an undefeated record of 12 wins, all fights by knockout. Kahwagi is infamous amongst boxing fans for charges of manipulated fights, which increased significantly after the knockouts against boxers Roberto José Coelho in 2005 and against Ramon Alejandro Olivas on September 11, 2015, and became one of the reasons explaining his withdrawal from the sport. His fight against Olivas has been called "one of the most infamous fiascos in recent boxing history".

Politics
Kahwagi was a member of Mexico's PVEM political party. In 2000, he was elected as a commissioner of the Mexican Government, and he was assigned to different ventures such as being a member of Mexico's commission on the United States and on Japan.

Media
Kahwagi asked to be excused from his post in Congress in order to be a contestant on Big Brother México for Big Brother VIP 3 (Part 2). He was in the house for the full 50 days and ended up coming third.

Personal life
He was engaged to Mexican actress Marlene Favela.

References

External links

 

1968 births
Living people
Mexican people of Lebanese descent
Businesspeople from Mexico City
Politicians from Mexico City
Members of the Chamber of Deputies (Mexico)
Ecologist Green Party of Mexico politicians
New Alliance Party (Mexico) politicians
21st-century Mexican politicians
Big Brother (franchise) contestants
Mexican male boxers
Cruiserweight boxers
Boxers from Mexico City
Deputies of the LIX Legislature of Mexico